The Lumberville–Raven Rock Bridge, also known as the Lumberville Foot Bridge,  is a free pedestrian bridge over the Delaware River. The bridge connects Bull's Island Recreation Area near Raven Rock, Delaware Township in Hunterdon County, New Jersey to Lumberville, Solebury Township in Bucks County, Pennsylvania, United States. The bridge, which is one of the two exclusively pedestrian bridges over the Delaware River, is owned and operated by the Delaware River Joint Toll Bridge Commission.

History

The Pennsylvania and New Jersey legislatures approved the construction of a bridge at Lumberville in 1835-1836, however construction was not begun until 1853.  This delay spared the bridge the possible ravages of a major flood in 1841. The bridge, with four spans crossing the river and another crossing the Delaware Canal, was a wooden covered type, engineered by Solon Chapin of Easton, Pennsylvania and a partner, Anthony Fry.  The bridge was built by the Lumberville Delaware River Bridge Company and completed in 1856.

The original covered bridge incurred major damage in the flood of 1903 and one of the three river spans was washed away.  Repairs were made and the single missing span was replaced in 1904 by a steel truss section. The toll bridge was sold to the DRJTBC in 1932. The replacement span served until February 1944 when the remaining timber spans were declared unsafe and condemned.  The Joint Toll Bridge Commission determined at this time that there was no longer a need for a vehicular bridge at the site and in 1947 the Trenton, New Jersey firm of John A Roebling's Sons, Co. was hired to replace the structure with a pedestrian bridge.  The original 1855 piers and abutments were deemed sound and at a total cost of $75,000 the bridge was rebuilt as a five span suspension bridge.  A major flood in 1955 destroyed several Delaware River bridges but the Lumberville-Raven Rock bridge survived and remains in use today.

A major rehabilitation contract was completed in 1993. The project included a new deck, new lighting and repainting.

See also
 List of crossings of the Delaware River
 Delaware and Raritan Canal State Park (New Jersey)
 Delaware Canal State Park (Pennsylvania)

References

External links
 https://web.archive.org/web/20070210223415/http://www.njskylands.com/hsdelbridges.htm, Accessed November 2, 2009
 https://web.archive.org/web/20120223223702/http://www.pennridge.org/works/lumberville.html, Accessed (web archive) January 2. 2022

Delaware River Joint Toll Bridge Commission
Bridges over the Delaware River
Bridges in Hunterdon County, New Jersey
Suspension bridges in New Jersey
Suspension bridges in Pennsylvania
Bridges completed in 1904
Bridges in Bucks County, Pennsylvania
Road bridges in New Jersey
Road bridges in Pennsylvania
Pedestrian bridges in New Jersey
Pedestrian bridges in Pennsylvania
Covered bridges in Pennsylvania
Covered bridges in Bucks County, Pennsylvania
Covered bridges in New Jersey
Covered bridges in Hunterdon County, New Jersey
Former road bridges in the United States
Former toll bridges in New Jersey
Former toll bridges in Pennsylvania
Steel bridges in the United States
Wooden bridges in Pennsylvania